Mount Terror can refer to:

 Mount Terror (Antarctica)
 Mount Terror (Washington), United States